Charisma Taylor (born September 3, 1999) is a Bahamian hurdler and jumper from Nassau, Bahamas who competes in the 100m Hurdles, triple jump and long jump. She attended SPIRE Institute and Academy in Geneva, Ohio, before going on to compete for Washington State Cougars and the Tennessee Volunteers.

Taylor has won multiple CARIFTA Games gold medals.

Personal bests

References

External links
 World Athletics Bio
 WSU Cougars Bio
Tennessee Volunteers Bio 

1999 births
Living people
Bahamian female sprinters
Bahamian female hurdlers
People from Nassau, Bahamas
Sportspeople from Nassau, Bahamas
Bahamian female triple jumpers
Bahamian female long jumpers
Washington State University alumni
University of Tennessee alumni